Hee-Sun Lee (born June 4, 1983), known professionally by the stage name HeeSun Lee, is an American Christian hip hop musician. Her first studio album released by Jahrock'n in 2008, Re:Defined.. She released, Stereotypes, in 2014, with In My City Records.  This was her Billboard chart breakthrough release.

Early life
HeeSun Lee was born Hee-Sun Lee on June 4, 1983, in Seoul, South Korea, but was abandoned by both of her birth parents at four months old. She was then adopted by Chinese-American immigrants, who brought her to live and reside in Staten Island, New York.

Music career
Her music career got started in 2008, with the release of Re:Defined. by Jahrock'n Productions. She released her second album, Stereotypes, on January 21, 2014 with In My City Records. This would be her Billboard chart breakthrough album on the Top Gospel Albums chart at No. 25. The album was reviewed by Wade-O Radio where they called it "a great one", Jam the Hype receiving a 7.6 out of ten, and Reel-Gospel receiving a three out of five star rating.

Discography

Studio albums

References

1983 births
21st-century American rappers
21st-century American women musicians
American adoptees
American musicians of Korean descent
American performers of Christian hip hop music
American rappers of Asian descent
American rappers of East Asian descent
American women rappers
East Coast hip hop musicians
South Korean adoptees
Living people
Musicians from New York City
People from Staten Island
Rappers from New York (state)
Rappers from New York City
Songwriters from New York (state)
South Korean emigrants to the United States
21st-century women rappers